Denis McCullough  (24 January 1883 – 11 September 1968) was a prominent Irish nationalist political activist in the early 20th century, who served as President of the Irish Republican Brotherhood (IRB) from 1915 to 1916.

Early career – IRB activist
McCullough was born at 1 Barrack Street, Belfast, on 24 January 1883, to Daniel McCullough, a publican, and Margaret Magee.

McCullough was a separatist nationalist from an early age. Both his father and grandfather were in the Irish Republican Brotherhood (IRB), as was his brother. When he was 17, his father had him inducted into the IRB at the side door of a pub by a man who seemed to view the ritual as an unpleasant distraction to a night of drinking. The event disillusioned McCullough with the IRB, and he took it upon himself to revitalise the organisation, with assistance from, among others, Bulmer Hobson and Seán Mac Diarmada. The trio founded the Dungannon Clubs as a non-sectarian, republican, separatist organisation (it was later absorbed into Sinn Féin), for recruitment. They worked to remove "armchair republicans" from positions of power. Their cause prospered with the return of veteran Fenian Tom Clarke to Ireland in 1907.

President of IRB and Easter Rising
McCullough was elected to fill the vacant seat of the President of the IRB late in 1915, a position he held during the Easter Rising of 1916, though he took no active role in the rising itself. He was not a member of the Military Committee that was responsible for its planning. It is likely that the other members of the three man IRB executive, Clarke and MacDermott (the treasurer and secretary) supported his nomination as president because, as he was isolated in Belfast, he would be in no position to interfere with their plans. Nevertheless, during Holy Week he got word of what was afoot and travelled to Dublin to question Clarke and MacDermott, who avoided him as long as they could. Eventually they informed him of their plans, which he came to support. Although McCullough was an officer of the Irish Volunteers, in charge of 200 men in Belfast, it was decided that Belfast would not take part in the rising, given that the dominance of the Ulster Volunteers in the northeast could lead to sectarian civil war.

McCullough stated in his application for an Irish military pension in 1937 that, 'I brought out my men in Belfast and mobilised them at Coalisland to cooperate with the Tyrone Volunteers in accordance with orders from Pearse and Connolly received by me. Their orders were to bring all available men and arms across Ulster to Connaught to join Mellows there. They were insistent, especially James Connolly, that we were to "fire no shot in Ulster". I thought these orders were mad ones but determined to carry out orders if possible'.

McCullough led Volunteers in his area to Dungannon, County Tyrone, from where they would link up with Liam Mellows in Connacht. Although the Volunteer's Chief of Staff Eoin MacNeill issued a countermanding order, cancelling orders for the rising, McCullough took 150 Volunteers and Cumman na mBan by train from Belfast to Dungannon, where he found the local volunteers under Patrick McCartan did not want to leave their home area. McCullough therefore decided to return to Belfast. During the abortive Rising, he accidentally shot himself in the hand. He was arrested that week and taken to Richmond Barracks, Dublin. He spent several months interned at Frongoch internment camp and imprisoned in Reading Gaol.

On his release he married Agnes Ryan, a sister of James Ryan, Josephine Ryan and Phyllis Ryan
 and sister-in-law to their husbands Seán T. O'Kelly and Richard Mulcahy.

It has been argued that as president of the Irish Republican Brotherhood at the time of the Easter Rising, the title President of the Irish Republic was by rights his, and not Patrick Pearse's. However, as he had no real role in the planning of the insurrection, and was not in the vicinity of Dublin, where it was clear the leadership would need to be, it is understandable that Pearse was given the title instead. McCullough's decision not to fight in the Easter Rising lost him his pre-eminent position among Belfast republicans. One, Sean Cusack, later said that he told McCullough, "we all felt he had, to some extent, let us down".

War of Independence and Treaty
McCullough felt he was sidelined during the Rising, and left the IRB. He was an ordinary volunteer in the Irish War of Independence (1919–1921), during which he was arrested and imprisoned by the British several times and held for long periods. He was imprisoned from May 1918 to March 1919 and again from September 1920 to January 1921 and finally from late January to December 1921.

In early 1922 he was sent by Michael Collins to America to liaise between the IRB and its American sister organisation Clan na Gael.

In 1922, he supported the Anglo-Irish Treaty, despite its acceptance of the Partition of Ireland, as a way of keeping the republican movement united and focused on the north. He later said of the split in the southern movement, "while they were making up their minds about the Treaty, their people in the north were being killed day by day. They could not stand up the terror in Ulster unless they had a united organisation behind them". He was unaware  that Michael Collins continued to covertly arm the IRA in Ulster until August 1922, partly to protect nationalists there and partly to try to bring down the Northern Irish state.

After the Treaty, in early 1922 he was sent by George Gavan Duffy to the United States to make contact with Irish republican organisations there. He later settled in Dublin in the new Irish Free State.

Business and later political career
McCullough's political activity went alongside maintaining and developing an instrument making and retail music business in Belfast's Howard Street, generated from his original trade as a piano tuner. F.J. Biggar, the solicitor antiquarian and friend of Roger Casement, encouraged its growth with orders for bagpipes for his boy bands. In time, after he moved to Dublin, this became McCullough Pigott of Suffolk Street and marked the beginning of a highly successful and influential Free State business career. He distinguished himself in forming the New Ireland Assurance Company. A director of Clondalkin Paper Mills, he also had a role in the Irish Army School of Music, and the Gate Theatre. While in the U.S. as Special Commissioner for the Free State (leaving his wife in charge of the music business), McCullough's new premises in Dawson Street were destroyed by an Anti-Treaty IRA land mine as a reprisal during the Irish Civil War.

He was an unsuccessful Sinn Féin candidate at the 1918 general election for the Tyrone South constituency. On 20 November 1924, McCullough stood as the Cumann na nGaedheal candidate at a by-election in the Donegal constituency, following the resignation of Cumann na nGaedheal TD Peter Ward. He was elected to the 4th Dáil, but did not stand again at the next general election, held in June 1927.

References

1883 births
1968 deaths
Cumann na nGaedheal TDs
Irish Republican Army (1919–1922) members
Members of the 4th Dáil
Members of the Irish Republican Brotherhood
Politicians from Belfast
Sinn Féin parliamentary candidates